"Fantasi" is a song written by Christer Sandelin and Tommy Ekman, originally recorded by Freestyle on the 1981 album Fantasi, as well as released as a single the same year, peaking at 13th position at the Swedish singles chart. The song lyrics describe a boy afraid of asking a girl over getting together with her, but in his fantasy they're already together, "rolling around among soft pillows". The song was also recorded with lyrics in English, as Fantasy, on Fantasy, which was the English-language version of the same album.

In 1998, during the band reunion, Freestyle released a 1998 version called  Fantasi '98, peaking at 37th position at the Swedish singles chart. Tested for Svensktoppen on 12 September 1998 it failed to enter chart.

The song was also recorded by  Miio, together with Ayo, on the 2003 album På vårt sätt. In 2005, the song was recorded by Popcorn on the album Popcorn.

Charts

"Fantasi '98"

References

External links 

 

1981 songs
1981 singles
Freestyle (Swedish band) songs
Songs written by Christer Sandelin
Swedish-language songs